Agent Provocateur is the fifth studio album by the British-American rock band Foreigner, released on December 7, 1984. The album was the band's first and only number one album in the United Kingdom, and it reached the top 5 in the United States. Although album sales were lower than their previous work in the US, it contains the band's biggest hit single, "I Want to Know What Love Is", which is their only #1 single in the UK and the US, staying at the top spot for three and two weeks, respectively. The follow-up single, "That Was Yesterday", also proved to be a sizeable hit, peaking at #12 in the US The album was certified Platinum in the UK by the BPI, and triple Platinum in the US by the RIAA.

Recording 
Within nearly two years of releasing 4, writing and preproduction for this album began as early as June 1983 in New York, with producer Trevor Horn. Then, once writing had been completed in September that year, official recording began in early October in London with Horn. Eventually, things started to fall apart around the time of the Christmas holidays – even though co-producer & guitarist Mick Jones recalled that it began after a day of recording – due to Horn being more concerned about the performance of the singles he had produced in Europe (for bands such as Frankie Goes to Hollywood) than the Foreigner record. Eventually, another month was spent trying to look for another producer to fill his shoes, subsequently hiring Alex Sadkin, who was busy finishing the Thompson Twins' Into the Gap album. Sadkin helped rekindle the project when it was on the verge of total collapse, but despite that, according to Jones, recording still never seemed to end: the sessions had been dogged from the very start and continued to remain unfocused. Sadkin agreed when reminiscing on the project in 1987:

Even though the extent of Horn's contributions to the record is unclear, he claims to have done most of the backing tracks, including for "I Want To Know What Love Is". According to singer Lou Gramm, owing to the difference in production styles between Sadkin and Horn, only two of the tracks that had been cut with the latter were kept on the record, though it is unclear which ones. A total of nine months had been spent on recording the album.

Critical reception
By the time of Agent Provocateur, Foreigner was frequently savaged by the contemporary rock music press. A review in Creem read: "On this, their latest excursion into the gaping jaws of pulverizing mediocrity, our boys continue to wrestle with an all-too-turgid identity crisis — they still can't decide whether it's stupider to aspire to poor man's Led Zep status or settle for being a weightier version of Chicago. Some swinging choice, huh? Either way they lose and this record is simply jammed with one dull defeat after another."

Ultimate Classic Rock critic Eduardo Rivadavia rated "A Love in Vain" as Foreigner's fifth-most underrated song, calling it a "synth-powered cry of desperation" and a "dark-horse favorite of fans."  

Classic Rock critic Malcolm Dome rated two songs from Agent Provocateur as being among Foreigner's 10 most underrated – "Stranger in My Own House" at #6 and "Tooth and Nail" – which he describes as "the antidote to 'I Want to Know What Love Is'" – at #2.

Billboard said that in "Tooth and Nail" the band flex "post-punk power chords with gusto."

Track listing

Personnel 

Foreigner
 Lou Gramm – lead vocals, percussion
 Mick Jones – keyboards, synthesizers, guitars, bass, backing vocals
 Rick Wills – bass, backing vocals
 Dennis Elliott – drums

Additional personnel
 Wally Badarou – analog and digital synthesizers
 Tom Bailey – synthesizers on "I Want to Know What Love Is"
 Brian Eddolls – synthesizers
 Larry Fast – synthesizers
 Dave Lebolt – synthesizers
 Bob Mayo – keyboards, acoustic piano, backing vocals
 Jack Waldman – synthesizers
 Mark Rivera – saxophone, backing vocals
 Thompson Twins – backing vocals
 Ian Lloyd – backing vocals
 Don Harper – backing vocals on "I Want to Know What Love Is"
 Jennifer Holliday – backing vocals and arrangement on "I Want to Know What Love Is"
 New Jersey Mass Choir of the GMWA – backing vocals on "I Want to Know What Love Is"

Production 
 Producers – Mick Jones and Alex Sadkin
 Chief Engineer – Frank Filipetti
 Additional Engineers – Josh Abbey, Larry Alexander, Jason Corsaro, Joe Ferla and Howie Lindeman.
 Assistant Engineers – Bobby Cohen, Tim Crich and Scott Mabuchi.
 Original Mastering and Digital Remastering –  Ted Jensen at Sterling Sound, NYC.
 Art Direction and Design – Bob Defrin
 Management – Bud Prager, E.S.P. Management Ltd.

Charts

Weekly charts

Year-end charts

Certifications

References 

Foreigner (band) albums
1984 albums
Albums produced by Alex Sadkin
Albums produced by Mick Jones (Foreigner)
Atlantic Records albums